Daniel Christian Nkemjika Olinya is an Anglican bishop in Nigeria: he is the current Bishop of Eha - Amufu.

Olinya was educated at the National Open University of Nigeria.

Notes

Living people
Anglican bishops of Eha-Amufu
21st-century Anglican bishops in Nigeria
National Open University of Nigeria alumni
Year of birth missing (living people)